Cognac – Châteaubernard Air Base ( or BA 709)  is a base of the French Air and Space Force (Armée de l'air et de l'espace) located in Châteaubernard, 2.8 kilometres south of Cognac. Both locations are communes of the Charente département in the Nouvelle-Aquitaine région of France. The base is home to the Ecole de Pilotage de l'Armee de l'Air, the air force initial pilot training school.

It was used by the German Luftwaffe in World War II. The Luftwaffe's operations included anti-submarine Focke-Wulf Fw 200 Condors as late as July 1944.

Units

 Escadron de Drones 1/33 Belfort with the General Atomics MQ-9 Reaper
 Escadron de Drones 2/33 Savoie with the General Atomics MQ-9 Reaper
 Escadron de Transformation Opérationnelle Drones 3/33 Moselle
 École de Pilotage de l’Armée de l’Air 315 Général Jarry with Pilatus PC-21 and the Grob
 Escadron D'Instruction en Vol 1/13 Artois
 Escadron D'Instruction en Vol 2/12 Picardie

References

External links 
Official site 
BA 709 Cognac at French Air Force site 
Airport Chart at French Air Force site 
Aéroport de Cognac - Châteaubernard page at Union des Aéroports Français 

French Air and Space Force bases
Buildings and structures in Charente